CrowdMed is a healthcare platform based in San Francisco, California. Jared Heyman, Axel Setyanto and Jessica Greenwalt founded the company in 2012. CrowdMed aims to diagnose rare medical conditions through crowdsourcing and  applying prediction market technology to medical data. As of May 2015, CrowdMed has solved over 900 cases.

History

CrowdMed was founded in 2012. During the creation process, the company's website was tested with 300 randomly selected people.

In 2013, CrowdMed launched its public beta at TEDMED in Washington, D.C. 

CrowdMed has users in 21 countries around the world, and has raised $2.4 million in seed funding from investors including New Enterprise Associates, Greylock Partners, Y Combinator, Andreessen Horowitz, Khosla Ventures and Patrick Dempsey.

Operations
User information is kept anonymous and their profile includes symptoms, health history, family background, and previous testing. Hundreds of "medical detectives" then submit possible diagnoses which other detectives elaborate on. These "medical detectives" can be anyone from medical school students, to retired physicians, to anyone else, as there is no requirement for a medical degree to use the app. The top three diagnoses are given to the patient for them to take to their doctor. The results from each medical detective are weighed based on their prior performance and current rating from patients, additionally medical detectives may also earn and share monetary rewards offered by patients to anyone who helps solve their case.

Reception
Users have expressed concerns that the information provided may not always come from reliable sources.

References

External links
Official site

American medical websites
American companies established in 2013
Companies based in San Francisco